The Revised Standard Version Catholic Edition (RSVCE) is an English translation of the Bible first published in 1966. In 1965, the Catholic Biblical Association adapted, under the editorship of Bernard Orchard OSB and Reginald C. Fuller, the Revised Standard Version (RSV) for Catholic use. It contains the deuterocanonical books of the Old Testament placed in the traditional order of the Vulgate. The editors' stated aim for the RSV Catholic Edition was "to make the minimum number of alterations, and to change only what seemed absolutely necessary in the light of Catholic tradition."

Noted for the formal equivalence of its translation, it is widely used and quoted by Catholic scholars and theologians, and is used for scripture quotations in the Catechism of the Catholic Church. The RSV is considered the first ecumenical Bible and brought together the two traditions – the Catholic Douay–Rheims Bible and the Protestant King James Version.

Background 
The 1943 encyclical of Pope Pius XII, Divino afflante Spiritu, encouraged translations of the Catholic Bible from the original languages instead of the Vulgate alone, as had been the tradition since the Council of Trent. "It was in fact with a view to filling this rather obvious gap in the shortest possible time that some Catholic scholars considered the possibility of so editing the Revised Standard Version, on its appearance in 1952, as to make it acceptable to Catholic readers."

In 1965, the RSV-CE New Testament was published.

Considerations for an RSV Catholic Edition 

A Catholic Bible differs in the number, order, and occasionally preferred emphasis from books typically found in Bibles used by Protestants. The Catholic Church declares: "Easy access to Sacred Scripture should be provided for all the Christian faithful. That is why the Church from the very beginning accepted as her own that very ancient Greek translation of the Old Testament which is called the Septuagint; and she has always given a place of honor to other Eastern translations and Latin ones especially the Latin translation known as the Vulgate." Not all the books in the Septuagint are included among those that the Catholic Church considers to be part of the Old Testament.

RSV Second Catholic Edition (RSV-2CE)

In early 2006, Ignatius Press released the Revised Standard Version, Second Catholic Edition (RSV-2CE). The Ignatius Edition "was revised according to [the norms of] Liturgiam authenticam, 2001" and "approved under the same [i.e. 1966] imprimatur by the Secretariat for Doctrine and Pastoral Practices, National Council of Catholic Bishops, February 29, 2000." To that end, Ignatius Press submitted its proposed revisions to the United States Conference of Catholic Bishops and to the Congregation for Divine Worship, making specifically-requested changes to those portions of the text in liturgical use as lectionary readings. As with the original RSV and its first Catholic edition, the translation copyright remains in the hands of the National Council of Churches. The RSV-2CE is the basis for Ignatius Press' The Ignatius Catholic Study Bible: New Testament, and is likewise used in Midwest Theological Forum's The Didache Bible, a study bible with commentaries based on the Catechism of the Catholic Church. The RSV-2CE is also the translation used in the English Language version Great Adventure Catholic Bible, published By Ascension Press. Father Mike Schmitz reads from this translation in his Bible in a Year podcast. 

The Second Catholic Edition removed archaic pronouns (thee, thou) and accompanying verb forms (didst, speaketh), revised passages used in the lectionary according to the Vatican document Liturgiam authenticam and elevated some passages out of RSV footnotes when they favored Catholic renderings. For instance, the RSV-2CE renders "almah" as "virgin" in Isaiah 7:14, restores the term "begotten" in John 3:16 and other verses, uses the phrase "full of grace" instead of "favored one" in Luke 1:28, and substitutes "mercy" for "steadfast love" (translated from the Hebrew hesed) throughout the Psalms.

Liturgical use and endorsements 
Catholic authors Scott Hahn, Curtis Mitch, and Jimmy Akin use the RSV2CE.

Although the revised lectionary based on the New American Bible is the only English-language lectionary that may be used at Roman Rite Catholic Mass in the United States, the Revised Standard Version, Second Catholic Edition has been approved for liturgical use in Ordinariate Catholic parishes for former Anglicans around the world. To that end, Ignatius Press has published a lectionary based on the RSV-2CE, approved for use by the Episcopal Conference of the Antilles and by the Congregation for Divine Worship and the Discipline of the Sacraments for use in the personal ordinariates. The Personal Ordinariate of Our Lady of Walsingham in the United Kingdom has adopted the RSV-2CE as "the sole lectionary authorized for use" in its liturgies, and the Catholic Bishops' Conference of England and Wales agreed in November 2015 to ask approval to use it in a new lectionary for England and Wales.

See also
 Dei verbum
 English Standard Version Catholic Edition
 Latin Vulgate
 Divino afflante Spiritu
 Second Vatican Council
 Liturgiam authenticam

References

Further reading 

 Extensive review of the RSV

External links 
Revised Standard Version Catholic Edition, online text 
RSV-CE on EWTN

1966 books
Bible translations into English
1966 in Christianity
Catholic bibles